In mathematics, more specifically functional analysis and operator theory, the notion of unbounded operator provides an abstract framework for dealing with differential operators, unbounded observables in quantum mechanics, and other cases.

The term "unbounded operator" can be misleading, since
 "unbounded" should sometimes be understood as "not necessarily bounded";
 "operator" should be understood as "linear operator" (as in the case of "bounded operator");
 the domain of the operator is a linear subspace, not necessarily the whole space;
 this linear subspace is not necessarily closed; often (but not always) it is assumed to be dense;
 in the special case of a bounded operator, still, the domain is usually assumed to be the whole space.

In contrast to bounded operators, unbounded operators on a given space do not form an algebra, nor even a linear space, because each one is defined on its own domain.

The term "operator" often means "bounded linear operator", but in the context of this article it means "unbounded operator", with the reservations made above. The given space is assumed to be a Hilbert space. Some generalizations to Banach spaces and more general topological vector spaces are possible.

Short history
The theory of unbounded operators developed in the late 1920s and early 1930s as part of developing a rigorous mathematical framework for quantum mechanics. The theory's development is due to John von Neumann and Marshall Stone. Von Neumann introduced using graphs to analyze unbounded operators in 1932.

Definitions and basic properties 
Let  be Banach spaces.  An unbounded operator (or simply operator)  is a linear map  from a linear subspace —the domain of —to the space . Contrary to the usual convention,  may not be defined on the whole space .

An operator  is said to be closed if its graph  is a closed set. (Here, the graph  is a linear subspace of the direct sum , defined as the set of all pairs , where  runs over the domain of  .) The closedness can also be formulated in terms of the graph norm: an operator  is closed if and only if its domain  is a complete space with respect to the norm:

 

This also includes operators defined on the entire space , since the whole space is dense in itself.

A densely defined operator  on a Hilbert space  is called bounded from below if  is a positive operator for some real number .

Example 
Let  denote the space of continuous functions on the unit interval, and let  denote the space of continuously differentiable functions. We equip  with the supremum norm, making it a Banach space. Define the classical differentiation operator  by the usual formula:

 

Every differentiable function is continuous, so . We claim that  is a well-defined unbounded operator, with domain .

This is a linear operator, since a linear combination  of two continuously differentiable functions  is also continuously differentiable, and

The operator is not bounded. For example,

satisfy

but

The operator is densely defined, and closed.

The same operator can be treated as an operator  for many choices of Banach space  and not be bounded between any of them. At the same time, it can be bounded as an operator  for other pairs of Banach spaces , and also as operator  for some topological vector spaces . As an example let  be an open interval and consider

where:

Adjoint 
The adjoint of an unbounded operator can be defined in two equivalent ways. Let  be an unbounded operator between Hilbert spaces.

First, it can be defined in a way analogous to how one defines the adjoint of a bounded operator.

More precisely,  is defined in the following way.

since Riesz representation theorem allows the continuous dual of the Hilbert space  to be identified with the set of linear functionals given by the inner product. This vector  is uniquely determined by  if and only if the linear functional  is densely defined; or equivalently, if  is densely defined. The adjoint  exists if and only if  is densely defined.

Consequently, the domain of  could be anything; it could be trivial (that is, contains only zero). On the other hand, if  is defined on the whole space then  is bounded on its domain and therefore can be extended by continuity to a bounded operator on the whole space.

The other equivalent definition of the adjoint can be obtained by noticing a general fact. Define a linear operator  as follows:

Since  is an isometric surjection, it is unitary. Hence:  is the graph of some operator  if and only if  is densely defined. A simple calculation shows that this "some"  satisfies:

It follows immediately from the above definition that the adjoint  is closed. In particular, a self-adjoint operator (meaning ) is closed. An operator  is closed and densely defined if and only if 

Some well-known properties for bounded operators generalize to closed densely defined operators. The kernel of a closed operator is closed. Moreover, the kernel of a closed densely defined operator  coincides with the orthogonal complement of the range of the adjoint. That is,

If  has trivial kernel,  has dense range (by the above identity.) Moreover:

In particular,  has closed range if and only if  has closed range.

In contrast to the bounded case, it is not necessary that  since, for example, it is even possible that  does not exist. This is, however, the case if, for example,  is bounded.

A densely defined, closed operator  is called normal if it satisfies the following equivalent conditions:

 ;

Every self-adjoint operator is normal.

Transpose 

Let  be an operator between Banach spaces.

for all  and  Here, we used the notation: 

For any Hilbert space  there is the anti-linear isomorphism:

given by  where  
Through this isomorphism, the transpose  relates to the adjoint  in the following way:

where . (For the finite-dimensional case, this corresponds to the fact that the adjoint of a matrix is its conjugate transpose.) Note that this gives the definition of adjoint in terms of a transpose.

Closed linear operators 

Closed linear operators are a class of linear operators on Banach spaces. Many important linear operators which fail to be bounded turn out to be closed, such as the derivative and a large class of differential operators. 
 
Let  be two Banach spaces.
Equivalently,  is closed if its graph is closed in the direct sum .

Example 

Consider the derivative operator  where  is the Banach space of all continuous functions on an interval . 
If one takes its domain  to be , then  is a closed operator which is not bounded. 

Symmetric operators and self-adjoint operators 

An operator T on a Hilbert space is symmetric if and only if for each x and y in the domain of  we have .

In general, if T is densely defined and symmetric, the domain of the adjoint T∗ need not equal the domain of T. If T is symmetric and the domain of T and the domain of the adjoint coincide, then we say that T is self-adjoint.  Note that, when T is self-adjoint, the existence of the adjoint implies that T is densely defined and since T∗ is necessarily closed, T is closed.

A densely defined operator T is symmetric, if the subspace  (defined in a previous section) is orthogonal to its image  under J (where J(x,y):=(y,-x)).

An operator T is self-adjoint, if the two subspaces ,  are orthogonal and their sum is the whole space 

This approach does not cover non-densely defined closed operators. Non-densely defined symmetric operators can be defined directly or via graphs, but not via adjoint operators.

A symmetric operator is often studied via its Cayley transform.

An operator T on a complex Hilbert space is symmetric if and only if its quadratic form is real, that is, the number  is real for all x in the domain of T.

A densely defined closed symmetric operator T is self-adjoint if and only if T∗ is symmetric. It may happen that it is not.

A densely defined operator T is called positive (or nonnegative) if its quadratic form is nonnegative, that is,  for all x in the domain of T. Such operator is necessarily symmetric.

The operator T∗T is self-adjoint and positive for every densely defined, closed T.

The spectral theorem applies to self-adjoint operators  and moreover, to normal operators, but not to densely defined, closed operators in general, since in this case the spectrum can be empty.

A symmetric operator defined everywhere is closed, therefore bounded, which is the Hellinger–Toeplitz theorem.

Extension-related

By definition, an operator T is an extension of an operator S if .

Note that an everywhere defined extension exists for every operator, which is a purely algebraic fact explained at Discontinuous linear map#General existence theorem and based on the axiom of choice. If the given operator is not bounded then the extension is a discontinuous linear map. It is of little use since it cannot preserve important properties of the given operator (see below), and usually is highly non-unique.

An operator T is called closable if it satisfies the following equivalent conditions:
 T has a closed extension;
 the closure of the graph of T is the graph of some operator;
 for every sequence (xn) of points from the domain of T such that xn → 0 and also Txn → y it holds that .

Not all operators are closable.

A closable operator T has the least closed extension  called the closure of T. The closure of the graph of T is equal to the graph of  Other, non-minimal closed extensions may exist.

A densely defined operator T is closable if and only if T∗ is densely defined. In this case  and 

If S is densely defined and T is an extension of S then S∗ is an extension of T∗.

Every symmetric operator is closable.

A symmetric operator is called maximal symmetric if it has no symmetric extensions, except for itself. Every self-adjoint operator is maximal symmetric. The converse is wrong.

An operator is called essentially self-adjoint if its closure is self-adjoint. An operator is essentially self-adjoint if and only if it has one and only one self-adjoint extension.

A symmetric operator may have more than one self-adjoint extension, and even a continuum of them.

A densely defined, symmetric operator T is essentially self-adjoint if and only if both operators ,  have dense range.

Let T be a densely defined operator. Denoting the relation "T is an extension of S" by S ⊂ T (a conventional abbreviation for Γ(S) ⊆ Γ(T)) one has the following.
 If T is symmetric then T ⊂ T∗∗ ⊂ T∗.
 If T is closed and symmetric then T = T∗∗ ⊂ T∗.
 If T is self-adjoint then T = T∗∗ = T∗.
 If T is essentially self-adjoint then T ⊂ T∗∗ = T∗.

Importance of self-adjoint operators
The class of self-adjoint operators is especially important in mathematical physics. Every self-adjoint operator is densely defined, closed and symmetric. The converse holds for bounded operators but fails in general. Self-adjointness is substantially more restricting than these three properties. The famous spectral theorem holds for self-adjoint operators. In combination with Stone's theorem on one-parameter unitary groups it shows that self-adjoint operators are precisely the infinitesimal generators of strongly continuous one-parameter unitary groups, see Self-adjoint operator#Self-adjoint extensions in quantum mechanics. Such unitary groups are especially important for describing time evolution in classical and quantum mechanics.

See also 
 Hilbert space#Unbounded operators
 Stone–von Neumann theorem
 Bounded operator

Notes

References 

  (see Chapter 12 "General theory of unbounded operators in Hilbert spaces").
 
  
 
 
  (see Chapter 5 "Unbounded operators").
  (see Chapter 8 "Unbounded operators").
 
 

Linear operators
Operator theory

de:Linearer Operator#Unbeschränkte lineare Operatoren